Domino toppling is the activity of standing up dominoes in sequence known as a domino run and then triggering the first one in line to create a chain reaction also called the domino effect. A competition between two or more players to be first to have all one's dominoes fall is sometimes called a domino rally. If domino toppling is demonstrated to an audience it is called a domino show.

Description 
Domino toppling is achieved by standing dominoes on end and arranging them in the desired patterns and sequences. Such a sequence is called a domino run. Using dominoes of different colours, the builders are able to create patterns and images. The dominoes can have different top and back colours, meaning that the dominoes display different colours before and after being toppled. Other tricks include three-dimensional stackings; shapes such as spirals and letters; Rube Goldberg machines; special toppling techniques, and special effects. Only the first domino should be toppled by hand in order to initiate the process; the rest must be toppled automatically by one another in succession. Arrangements of millions of tiles have been made that have taken many minutes, even hours to fall. For large and elaborate arrangements, special blockages (also known as firebreaks) are employed at regular distances to prevent a premature toppling from undoing more than a section of the tiles while still being able to be removed without damage.

At one time, Pressman Toys manufactured a product called Domino Rally that contained tiles and mechanical devices for setting up toppling exhibits.

History 

The first public domino shows were those of Bob Speca, Jr. from Broomall, Pennsylvania, US. In 1976, at the age of 18, he established the first official world record for the most dominoes toppled in a chain reaction, by setting up and toppling down 11,111 pieces. That event, and his appearance on The Tonight Show triggered a domino-toppling craze, leading to a long lasting competition among domino-builders about the world record. In 1984, Klaus Friedrich from Germany was the last person to set up a new domino-toppling world record single-handedly. In that same year student film makers Sheri Herman and Bonnie Cutler from Temple University produced and directed the film And They All Fall Down, showcasing Speca's talents. The film is part of the permanent collection of the Berlin Film Museum. 

On 9 June 1979, British engineer Michael Cairney set a Guinness Book World Record by toppling 169,573 dominoes in Poughkeepsie, New York at the Mid-Hudson Civic Center benefiting the National Hemophilia Association.  After fifteen days of set-up, The World Domino Spectacular launched with over 30 domino stunts, Cairney and his all volunteer team cheered as the 22,000 square foot progressive topple crossed mini bridges, triggered a rocket, toppled spirals, knocked over a twenty foot domino peacock design and made the first domino-enabled international phone call to confirm the world record. Stunt engineer Bruce Duffy designed the World Domino Spectacular Stunt #22 which consisted of 53 flags representing the members of the World Federation of Hemophilia.

The Netherlands has hosted an annual domino-toppling exhibition called Domino Day since 1986. The event held on 18 November 2005 knocked over 4 million dominoes by a team from Weijers Domino Productions. On Domino Day 2008 (14 November 2008), the Weijers Domino Productions team attempted to set 10 records:
 Longest domino spiral (200 m)
 Highest domino climb (12 m)
 Smallest domino tile (7 mm)
 Largest domino tile (4.8 m)
 Longest domino wall (16 m)
 Largest domino structure (25,000 tiles)
 Fastest topple of 30 metres of domino tiles (4.21 sec, time by Churandy Martina: 3.81 sec)
 Largest number of domino tiles resting on a single domino (1002 tiles) for more than 1 hour
 Largest rectangular level domino field (1 million tiles)
 A new record of 4,345,027 tiles
This record attempt was held in the WTC Expo hall in Leeuwarden. The artist who toppled the first stone was the Finnish acrobat Salima Peippo.

A year later, in 2009, the world record of most dominoes toppled in one chain reaction was set to be 4,491,863 in Leeuwarden.

In 1998, the Netherlands hosted a domino toppling exhibition called Domino D-Day, it was renamed Domino Day, following the initial 1998 event. It ran annually until 2009, and has been suspended due to financial and administrative issues since 2010. Domino Day made popular the concept of the "Builder's Challenge" where in the build team must place dominoes into the project once the topple has already begun in order to complete the build in a "race against the clock" type challenge.

In Berlin on 9 November 2009, giant domino tiles were toppled in a 20th-anniversary commemoration of the fall of the Berlin Wall. Former Polish president and Solidarity leader Lech Wałęsa set the toppling in motion.

Since 2015, The Incredible Science Machine, an international, multi-team build event has been held annually in the USA. As of November 2017, they hold the current record for most dominoes toppled in America with just under 250,000.

Science 
The phenomenon also has some theoretical relevance (amplifier, digital signal, information processing), and this amounts to the theoretical possibility of building domino computers. Dominoes are also commonly used as components in Rube Goldberg machines.

References

External links
 Reuters article plus two-minute video of Domino Day 2006 (URL last accessed December 30, 2006)

 A list of links related to domino-toppling.

Show